Dugdale is a surname and may refer to:
Adam Dugdale (born 1987), English footballer
Alan Dugdale (born 1952), English footballer
Alex Dugdale, American saxophonist and jazz performer
Andrew Dugdale, fictional former Prime Minister of Australia in The Ex-PM
Arthur Dugdale (1869–1941), British Army officer
Blanche Dugdale (1880–1948), British author and Zionist
Dan Dugdale (1864-1934), American baseball player
Dean Dugdale (born 1963), former Australian rules footballer
Dugdale Stratford Dugdale (1773–1836), British politician
Edgar Dugdale (c. 1872–1964), English translator
Florence Dugdale (1879-1937, Max Gate), English writer of children's stories and the second wife of Thomas Hardy
Frederic Brooks Dugdale, British soldier
Glenn Dugdale (born 1961), former Australian rules footballer
Guy Dugdale (1905-1982), British bobsledder 
Henrietta Dugdale, Australian activist
James Dugdale, Oxford academic of the 16th century
James Dugdale, 2nd Baron Crathorne (born 1939), British art dealer
Jimmy Dugdale (1932–2008), English footballer
John Dugdale (photographer) (born 1960), American art photographer
John Dugdale (footballer), Australian rules player for North Melbourne
John Dugdale (Conservative politician) (1835–1920), English politician
John Dugdale (herald) (1628-1700), herald at the College of Arms, London, England
John Dugdale (Labour politician) (1905–1963), British newspaper journalist and politician
John Marshall Dugdale (1851–1918), English rugby union international 
Sir John Dugdale Astley, 1st Baronet (1778–1842), English politician
Sir John Dugdale Astley, 3rd Baronet (1828–1894), English soldier and sportsman
Joshua Dugdale (born 1974), British documentary film-maker
Ken Dugdale, soccer coach from New Zealand 
Kezia Dugdale, Scottish politician
Mark Dugdale, professional body builder
Michael Dugdale, fictional character in Utopia
Paul Dugdale (born 1967), British Circuit judge
Richard Dugdale (alleged demoniac) (born c.1670), English gardener and servant
Richard Louis Dugdale (1841–1883), American sociologist
Rick Dugdale, Canadian film producer
Robert Dugdale (pseudonym for Henry Hardy), British publisher.
Rose Dugdale (born c. 1941), English heiress who joined the Provisional Irish Republican Army
Sam Dugdale (born 2000), English rugby union player
Sasha Dugdale (born 1974), British poet, playwright, and translator
Stephen Dugdale (1640?-1683), English informer and figure of the Popish Plot 
Stewart Dugdale (born 1976), English film score composer
Thomas Dugdale, 1st Baron Crathorne, British politician
Thomas Cantrell Dugdale (1880–1952), British artist 
Una Dugdale, maiden name of Una Duval (1879–1975), British suffragette and marriage reformer
William Dugdale (1605-1686), antiquarian
Sir William Dugdale, 2nd Baronet (1922–2014), former chairman of Aston Villa F.C.
William Dugdale (publisher) (1800–1868), English publisher of pornographic literature
William Stratford Dugdale (1800–1871), English politician

See also
Dugdale baronets